I'm the Capataz (Italian: Io sono il capataz) is a 1951 Italian western-comedy film directed by Giorgio Simonelli and starring Renato Rascel, Silvana Pampanini and Marilyn Buferd.

It was shot at the Incir-De Paolis Studios in Rome. The film's sets were designed by the art directors Arrigo Equini. The film was a commercial hit, earning around 421 million lira at the box office.

Cast
Renato Rascel	as 	Uguccione / Rascelito Villa
Silvana Pampanini		as 	Rosa de Fuego
Luigi Pavese		as 	Erasmo
Marilyn Buferd		as 	Moira
Bruno Corelli	as 	Il Sarto Francese
Nino Crisman		as 	Gonzales
Vittorio Duse		as 	Puchero
Sophia Loren		as 	Segretaria del Dittatore 
Mario Pisu		as 	Hurtado
Virgilio Riento		as 	Il Guardiano
Vickie Henderson		as 	Danzatrice
Kiki Urbani		as 	Danzatrice Bianca
Carlo Delle Piane as giovane popolano
Alberto Sorrentino as un rivoluzionario

References

Bibliography
 Chiti, Roberto & Poppi, Roberto. Dizionario del cinema italiano: Dal 1945 al 1959. Gremese Editore, 1991.
 Gundle, Stephen. Fame Amid the Ruins: Italian Film Stardom in the Age of Neorealism. Berghahn Books, 2019.

External links
 

1951 films
1950s Italian-language films
1950s Western (genre) comedy films
Italian Western (genre) comedy films
Films directed by Giorgio Simonelli
1951 comedy films
Italian black-and-white films
1950s Italian films